K. P. Sasidharan (10 June 1938 – 17 June 2015) was a professor of English literature, critic, creative writer and translator in Malayalam. He was the winner of Soviet Land award and the Kerala Sangeeth Nataka Academy award. He was equally proficient in English and Malayalam literature. His contributions to Malayalam includes several novels, collection of short stories, and studies and translations from English to Malayalam.

Education
 Avittam Thirunal High School, Monkompu (1952–55): schooling
 S D College Alappuzha (1955–57) : Intermediate.
 University College Thiruvananthapuram (1957–60), B A (Hons) English Language and Literature.
 University of Calicut, Kozhikode, Doctor of Philosophy (1991)

Professional career

 St Thomas College, Kozhenchery, Kerala.  Lecturer in English (1960)
 Government Victoria College, Palakkad, Kerala (1961–1971)
 Government Maharajas College, Ernakulam Kerala, Professor and Head Department of English, (1971–1990)
 Government College Manimalakkunnu, Kerala, Principal (1991–92)
 Director, State Institute of Languages, Government of Kerala, Thiruvananthapuram, (1992–93)

Books published
No	Title	   Category	Publisher      Year 
    -------    -------------        ---------------       -----
	Anthassulla Manushyar	Novel	Mangalodayam Thrissur	1966.
	Uppu	Novel	Sahithya Pravarthaka Coop Society , Kottayam	1968.
	Udikkunnu Asthamikkunnu	Short stories	SPCS, Kottayam	1968.
	Vedanthikkas	Satire 	(Serialised in Mathrubhumy weekly) Poorna publication, kozhikode 	1970.
	Darling	Collection of short stories	SPCS, Kottayam	1970.
	Aanakompum Kurangukalum	Short stories	D C Books Kottayam	1978.
	Kalaghattathinte Sabdangal	Study	Current Books	1978.
	Jude the Obscure	Translation	SPCS, National Book Stall, Kottayam	1979.
	Rushyan Sahithyan Enthu Enthukontu 	Study on Russian literature	Prabhath  printers, Thiruvananthapuram	1981.
	Krishna	Studies (English)	McMillan Books, New Delhi	1982.
	Kavithayute Saaphalyam	Study	Mangala printing press	1982.
	Kavithayute Moonu Vazhikal	Study	Book Club	1983.
	Maranamillatha Vayalar	Study	India press kottayam	1984.
	Lenin Piranna Mannil	Travelogue	Prabhath  book house , Thiruvananthapuram	1985.
	KesavaDev- Makers of Indian Literature Series	Study	Kerala Sahithya Academy 1985.
	Poets in a changing world	Study (English)	Konark Publishers, New Delhi 	1991.
	Karikkattayil Ila Virinju	Children’s literature	State Institute of Languages, Kerala 	1998.
	Julius Caesar	Translation	D C Books	2000.
	Henry V	Translation	D C Books	2000.
	Merry Wives of Windsor	Translation	D C Books	2000.
	Troilus and Cressida	Translation	D C Books	2000.
	Cymbeline	Translation	D C Books	2000.
	Richard the third	Translation	D C Books	2000.
	All’s well that ends well	Translation	D C Books	2000.
	Lesson in Love	Translation	D C Books	2000.
	Alcestis	Translation	Mangala Publishers	2000.
	Lesson in Love	Translation	D C Books	2000.
	War and Peace	Translation	Chintha Publications. Thiruvananthapuram 	2010.
	Crime and Punishment	Translation	Chintha Publishers, Thiruvananthapuram 	2010.
	Hunchback of Notre Dame	Translation	Chintha Publishers, Thiruvananthapuram 	2010.

References (links)

1. http://www.sbcollege.org/library/authcat.php?idauth=Sasidharan,K%20P

2. https://www.amazon.com/Julius-Ceasar-K-P-Sasidharan-William-Shakespere/dp/B007E5F7DY

3. https://www.amazon.in/Yudhavum-Samadhanavum-Leo-Tolstoy/dp/9383155434/ref=sr_1_2?s=books&ie=UTF8&qid=1452241958&sr=1-2

4. http://www.indulekha.com/kuttavum-sikshayum-novel-dostoyevsky-chintha

5. http://www.maebag.com/OldVer/Product/18483/Malayalam_novel_Notredamile_Koonan__Victo_Hugo,_K_P_Sasidharan

6. https://www.amazon.com/Julius-Ceasar-William-Shakespere-K-P-Sasidharan/dp/B007E5F7DY/ref=sr_1_3?s=books&ie=UTF8&qid=1454335730&sr=1-3&refinements=p_n_feature_nine_browse-bin%3A3291506011

References

20th-century Indian translators
Indian male novelists
Malayalam-language writers
English literature academics
Indian literary critics
Scholars from Kerala
1938 births
2015 deaths
Novelists from Kerala
People from Palakkad district
20th-century Indian novelists
20th-century Indian male writers